Ramaria aurea is a coral mushroom in the family Gomphaceae. It is found in North America and Europe. It is similar to R. flava; both species are edible.

References

External links

Gomphaceae
Edible fungi
Fungi described in 1888
Fungi of North America